Sizzling brownie is a dessert available in India, made popular by cafes and restaurants of Mumbai and Kerala. It is a chocolate brownie with a scoop of ice cream on top served with a generous pouring of melted chocolate on the ice-cream. It is served on hot sizzler plates to be eaten directly in its sizzling hot form.

Ingredients 
Generally, a chocolate walnut brownie, vanilla ice cream and dark melted chocolate are used to prepare this dessert. Other nut-based brownies and ice cream flavours are also used in certain food joints. Gooey chocolate brownies are also used with seasonal fruits on the sides to create variants of sizzling brownies.

See also
 List of desserts

References

Chocolate desserts
Indian desserts